Apucarana is a municipality in the state of Paraná in Brazil. Its 2020 population was estimated as 136,234.

Transportation 
The city is served by Cap. João Busse Airport which is located 10 kilometers (5 nautical miles) southeast of Apucarana.

Economy

In agriculture, the city stands in production of coffee, soy, beans and corn. The industry stands out for leather production (3% of Brazil's total) and the manufacturing of caps (80% of production in Brazil).

Culture

The city received thousands of immigrants from Portugal, Ukraine, Poland, Germany and especially from Japan (who did strong influence in culture like in the Buddhist religion and the amount of cherry trees planted - the city has more than 20,000 sakuras and annually do the "Cherry Festival" to celebrate the Japanese culture).

source : PARDES 2010

Religion
The city is the seat of the Roman Catholic Diocese of Apucarana.

References

External links 
Prefeitura Municipal de Apucarana (City of Apucarana)
Informações sobre a Cidade (Business and Information from Apucarana)